Megan Gracia Montaner (born 21 August 1987) is a Spanish actress and former model. She is known for her roles in television shows The Secret of Puente Viejo, Grand Hotel and No Identity, all broadcast on Antena 3. Most recently she played Elena Martín in 30 Coins.

During the COVID-19 pandemic, many of her television projects were delayed indefinitely during a period of national quarantine.

Filmography

Film

Television

References

External links 

1987 births
Living people
People from Huesca
Spanish film actresses
Spanish television actresses
Spanish female models
21st-century Spanish actresses
Actresses from Aragon